Carl Jacob Bender was missionary pioneer to Cameroon.

References

Colonial people in Cameroon